{ "type": "ExternalData",
  "service": "geoline",
  "ids": "Q1717366",
  "properties": {
    "stroke": "#3b78cb",
    "stroke-width": 3} }

Westaue is a river of Lower Saxony, Germany. It springs from the confluence of the Rodenberger Aue and the Sachsenhäger Aue. It flows into the Leine north of Wunstorf.

See also
List of rivers of Lower Saxony

References

Rivers of Lower Saxony
Rivers of Germany